Bargaintown is an unincorporated community located within Egg Harbor Township, in Atlantic County, New Jersey, United States.

Bargaintown was laid out by a property developer who hoped the value would increase quickly, but when it did not, he sold the lots cheaply. The community has since been called Bargaintown.

The area is serviced by the Bargaintown Volunteer Fire Company #2 which has two stations located in the community. Station 1 is located at 6550 Mill Road and Station 2 is located at 1 Tony "Mink" Pagano Drive.

References

Egg Harbor Township, New Jersey
Unincorporated communities in Atlantic County, New Jersey
Unincorporated communities in New Jersey